Pol Bury (26 April 1922 – 28 September 2005) was a Belgian sculptor who began his artistic career as a painter in the Jeune Peintre Belge and COBRA groups. Among his most famous works is the fountain-sculpture L'Octagon, located in San Francisco.

His work was included in a 2008 auction at Christie's, the lot said to be the first of its kind in this kind of work. Among other locations, Bury's work is included in the Chelsea Art Museum's permanent collection.

References

1922 births
2005 deaths
Abstract painters
20th-century Belgian sculptors
20th-century Belgian painters